A Wardley map is a map for business strategy. Components are positioned within a value chain and anchored by the user need, with movement described by an evolution axis.  Wardley maps are named after Simon Wardley who created the technique at Fotango in 2005 having created the evolutionary framing the previous year. The technique was further developed within Canonical UK between 2008 and 2010 and components of mapping can be found in the "Better For Less" paper published in 2010.

Summary 
Each component in a Wardley map is classified both by its position within a chain of components (a value chain) anchored around an end user (whether customers, consumer, business, government or other) and by how evolved those component are. The evolution of a component is defined as a range from genesis to commodity. Components are drawn as nodes with relationships as lines between them.  A set of axis may also be added with visibility in the chain shown in a -axis and evolution on the -axis.

Much of the theory of Wardley mapping is set out in a series of nineteen blog posts written by Wardley which is a summary of Wardley's previous blog posts  and a dedicated wiki called Wardleypedia.

Example 
Imagine that a company wants to set up a new drone courier service. The user need is to receive packages quickly from the company. The company objective is to meet this user need by delivering packages quickly to customers. This is a high-value, low-commodity component and is placed at the top-left of a Wardley map. If there were dozens of competing drone courier companies, this component would move right on the Wardley map, indicating that the service is closer to being a commodity.

Other components are mapped similarly. For example, a drone operator needs to be aware of the weather conditions to determine the route a drone should take and the maximum weight it can carry. Weather information is of little value to the customer and can be bought from a wide range of weather data providers. It is thus placed at the bottom-right of the Wardley map.

Uses 
Wardley maps are used within UK government, with particular interest within the Government Digital Service (GDS) for strategic planning and identifying the best targets for government digital service modernisation.

They have been used to map the existing and planned technology infrastructure and services for High Speed 2 (HS2).

They have been used to map the value chain and maturity of components in security operations to support a large scale commercial organisation decide to build or outsource their security operations centre, SOC Value Chain & Delivery Models

Tools 
A number of tools exist including Online Wardley Maps, templates in Miro, plugins for visual studio, MapScript, Wardley Map generator in Golang, MapKeep, and Glamorous Toolkit.

Criticisms 

Simon Wardley claims that much of the process's value lies in "exposing assumptions. allowing challenge and creating consensus" — but detractors worry that the process in fact lets people "launder assumptions into facts, delegitimise challenge (and still create consensus)".

References

External links 
 Wardley mapping resources
 Wardley Maps (Spanish)
 Maps & Analysis

Diagrams
Business process modelling
Business models